Cheswick is a village in Northumberland, England. It is situated approximately south-east of Berwick-upon-Tweed, between the A1 and the North Sea coast.

Governance  
Cheswick is in the parliamentary constituency of Berwick-upon-Tweed.

Cheswick House
Cheswick House is a Grade II listed Victorian country house built in 1859 by Robert Crossman of Berwick-upon-Tweed, a brewer. In 1883 it was inherited by his son, Colonel (later Sir) William Crossman; the property remained in the Crossman family until 2002.

References

External links

Villages in Northumberland